Wanggil Station is a subway station on Line 2 of the Incheon Subway in Seo District, Incheon, South Korea.

Station layout

External links

  Station information from Incheon Transit Corporation

Metro stations in Incheon
Seoul Metropolitan Subway stations
Railway stations opened in 2016
Seo District, Incheon
Incheon Subway Line 2